Elsa Martinelli (born Elisa Tia; 30 January 1935 – 8 July 2017) was an Italian actress and fashion model.

Life and career 

Born Elisa Tia in Grosseto, Tuscany, she moved to Rome with her family. In 1953, she was discovered by Roberto Capucci who introduced her to the world of fashion. She became a model and began playing small roles in films. She appeared in Claude Autant-Lara's Le Rouge et le Noir (1954), but her first important film role came the following year with The Indian Fighter opposite Kirk Douglas, who claimed to have spotted her on a magazine cover and hired her for his production company, Bryna Productions. Douglas subsequently signed her to a two pictures a year for two years non-exclusive contract with Bryna Productions in February 1956. She was loaned out from Bryna Productions to Universal-International Pictures in March 1956 for the film Four Girls in Town.

In 1956, she won the Silver Bear for Best Actress at the 6th Berlin International Film Festival for playing the title role in Mario Monicelli's Donatella.

From the mid-1950s through the late 1960s, she divided her time between Europe and the United States, appearing in films such as Four Girls in Town (1957) with Julie Adams, Manuela (1957) with Trevor Howard, Prisoner of the Volga (1959) with John Derek, Hatari! (1962) with John Wayne,  The Pigeon That Took Rome (1962) with Charlton Heston, The Trial (1962) directed by Orson Welles, The V.I.P.s (1963) with Elizabeth Taylor and Richard Burton, Rampage (1963) with Robert Mitchum, Woman Times Seven (1967) with Shirley MacLaine, and Candy (1968) with Marlon Brando. From the late 1960s, she worked in Europe in mostly foreign language productions. Her last English language role was as Carla the Agent in Once Upon a Crime (1992) with John Candy. Her final acting appearance was in the 2005 European television series Orgoglio as the Duchessa di Monteforte.

Personal life 
Martinelli was first married to Count Franco Mancinelli Scotti di San Vito, by whom she had a daughter, Cristiana Mancinelli (born 1958), also an actress. In 1968, she married the Paris Match photographer and 1970s furniture designer, Willy Rizzo.

Death 
Martinelli died of cancer in Rome on 8 July 2017, at the age of 82.

Filmography 

 The Red and the Black (1954) (uncredited)
 If You Won a Hundred Million (1954) as Anna (segment "L'indossatrice")
 The Indian Fighter (1955) as Onahti
 Rice Girl (1956) as Elena Nardi
 Donatella (1956) as Donatella Guiscardi
 Four Girls in Town (1957) as Maria Antonelli
 Manuela (1957) as Manuela Hunt
  (1958) as Lucia
 Prisoner of the Volga (1959) as Mascha
 Ciao, ciao bambina! (1959) as Diana
 Tunis Top Secret (1959) as Kathy Sands
 Wild Cats on the Beach (1959) as Doriana
 Bad Girls Don't Cry (1959) as Anna
 Call Girls of Rome (1960) as Marisa
 Blood and Roses (1960) as Georgia Monteverdi
 Il carro armato dell'8 settembre (1960) as Mirella
 Captain Blood (1960) as Gisèle d'Angoulême
 Love in Rome (1960) as Fulvia
 The Menace (1961) as Lucile
 Hatari! (1962) as Anna Maria 'Dallas' D'Allesandro
 The Pigeon That Took Rome (1962) as Antonella Massimo
 Pelle viva (1962) as Rosaria
 The Trial (1962) as Hilda
 The V.I.P.s (1963) as Gloria Gritti
 Rampage (1963) as Anna
 All About Loving (1964) as Mathilde
 Marco the Magnificent (1965) as The Woman with the Whip
 Je vous salue, mafia! (1965) as Sylvia
 Diamonds Are Brittle (1965) as Juliette
  (1965) as Sonia
 The 10th Victim (1965) as Olga
 How I Learned to Love Women (1966) as Monica the rallye driver
 Maroc 7 (1967) as Claudia
 The Oldest Profession (1967) as Domitilla (segment "Nuits romaines, Les")
 Woman Times Seven (1967) as Pretty woman (segment "Super Simone")
  (1967) as Laureen
 Manon 70 (1968) as Annie
 The Belle Starr Story (1968) as Belle Starr
 Madigan's Millions (1968) as Vic Shaw
 Candy (1968) as Livia
 If It's Tuesday, This Must Be Belgium (1969) as Maria, Woman on Venetian bridge
  (1969) as Gilberte de Baer
 Una sull'altra (1969) as Jane Bleeker
 The Pleasure Pit (1969) as Martine
 L'amica (1969) as Carla Nervi
 OSS 117 Takes a Vacation (1970) as Elsa
  (1971) as Inés de Suárez
 The Lion's Share (1971) as Annie
  (1976) as Zobeida
 I Am an ESP (1985) as Carla Razzi
  (1988)
 Once Upon a Crime (1992) as Carla the Agent

References

External links 

 

1935 births
2017 deaths
20th-century Italian actresses
21st-century Italian actresses
Bryna Productions people
Deaths from cancer in Lazio
Italian female models
Italian film actresses
Italian television actresses
People from Grosseto
Silver Bear for Best Actress winners